Dailly is a surname. Notable people with the surname include:
Christian Dailly, a Scottish former football player
Eleonore Dailly, an American filmmaker
Eileen Dailly, a Canadian politician
Mike Dailly (lawyer), a member of the Govan Law Centre
Mike Dailly (game designer), a Scottish video game designer
Paul Dailly, a retired Scottish-Canadian soccer player

See also
Dailly, a village in South Ayrshire, Scotland
Fort de Dailly, a part of Fortress Saint-Maurice in Switzerland
Dailey
Daly (disambiguation)